Ferdinand of Bavaria may refer to:

 Ferdinand of Bavaria (bishop) (1577–1650)
 Ferdinand of Bavaria (soldier) (1550–1608)
 Prince Ferdinand of Bavaria (1884–1958)